The Oise-Aisne American Cemetery and Memorial is an American military cemetery in northern France. Plots A through D contains the graves of 6,012 American soldiers who died while fighting in this vicinity during World War I, 597 of which were not identified, as well as a monument for 241 Americans who were missing in action during battles in the same area and whose remains were never recovered. Included among the soldiers here who lost their lives is poet Joyce Kilmer (1886–1918).

A graveyard for former soldiers that were dishonorably discharged and executed for crimes committed during World War II, referred to as Plot E, is nearby. Private Eddie Slovik (1920–1945), the only American soldier executed for desertion during World War II, was buried there until 1987.

Site 

It was initially established on August 2, 1918 by the 42nd Division as a temporary cemetery, but was retained as a permanent cemetery by Congress in 1921. The French government provides the site at no cost for use as a military cemetery. The memorials were designed by Cram and Ferguson and the landscape architect was George Gibbs, Jr.

The cemetery is generally rectangular in shape. The chapel, museum and grave plots are one side of the road and a parking area and the service facilities on the other side. The plots are divided by a walkway with a circular island of grass in the middle. The sides of the cemetery include paths, a privet hedge, and a low stone wall.

War dead buried at this site 

Most of the 6,012 soldiers and support personnel honorably interred at this site died fighting during the Second Battle of the Marne and the Oise-Aisne campaign. The site also includes American servicemen who were buried in temporary cemeteries and were moved to this site when their families requested that they be buried overseas. All 48 of the states that existed at the time, as well as the District of Columbia, are represented. Stars of David mark graves of Jewish soldiers, all others have a Latin Cross. The headstones are made from white marble quarried in Carrara, Italy.

597 graves at this site are for unknown soldiers. Like the Tomb of the Unknowns in Arlington, Virginia, the graves are marked:

HERE RESTS IN HONORED GLORY
AN AMERICAN SOLDIER
KNOWN BUT TO GOD

The memorial 
At the far end of the cemetery there is a semi-circular memorial of marble and granite in a Romanesque style. A small chapel is to the memorial's right, and a one-room museum to the left. There are ten double columns that include the Division numbers of American soldiers who fought in this sector, the 1st, 2nd, 3rd, 4th, 26th, 28th, 32nd, 42nd, 77th, and 93rd. The sides of the columns are engraved with images of contemporary equipment such as gas masks and artillery shells. The columns are separated by four statues: two of soldiers, one of St. Michael and one of St. George. There is an inscription on the monument:

THESE ENDURED ALL AND GAVE ALL
THAT HONOR AND JUSTICE MIGHT PREVAIL AND
THAT THE WORLD MIGHT ENJOY FREEDOM AND INHERIT PEACE

The rear of the monument identifies the American Battle Monuments Commission and the architects. On the friese and the exterior walls of the chapel and museum are 23 carved shields representing the branch and service insignia that served in this region of France, and the museum and chapel both include stylized versions of the Great Seal of the United States.

The names of 241 American soldiers missing in the area who were never found or whose bodies were never identified are inscribed on the walls of the chapel. The museum includes a dedicatory relief in English and French as well as a large map of the Aisne-Marne region.

Plot E 

The cemetery also contains an area known as Oise-Aisne American Cemetery Plot E, which contains the remains of the "dishonorable dead"—96 Americans who were dishonorably discharged from the US Army before being executed for crimes of rape or murder. Plot E is separate from the main cemetery, in an area secluded by hedges and accessible only through a door in the superintendent's office.

Gallery

See also

 World War I memorials
 A List of US Service Personnel Executed During World War II

References

External links
 American Battle Monuments Commission
 

1918 establishments in France
American Battle Monuments Commission
Buildings and structures in Aisne
Ralph Adams Cram buildings
Tourist attractions in Aisne
Museums in Aisne
World War I museums in France
World War I cemeteries in France
World War II memorials in France
World War II cemeteries in France